Darwin Cordale Quinn (born October 7, 1987), known professionally as Lil' C (also known as C-Gutta), is an American hip hop record producer, songwriter, and rapper. He’s perhaps best known for producing Atlanta-based rapper Young Dro's 2006 debut single, "Shoulder Lean", which led to a deal with Grand Hustle Records. Quinn is also part of the record production team Smash Factory, alongside frequent collaborator Mars and Grand Hustle label-boss T.I.

Musical career
Quinn began producing hip hop beats as a means to make money and pay his bills. He embarked on this path at a young age, selling beats to classmates at the high school he attended. At fifteen, he was working in a studio that was housed under Hot 97.7 in Jackson, Mississippi, which is how he made a lot of connections in the music industry early on.

At the age 17, Quinn produced the song "My Hood", for Young Jeezy, which was the third single from his debut album Let's Get It: Thug Motivation 101 (2005). He would later meet Jason Geter, the chief executive officer (CEO) of American rapper T.I.'s Grand Hustle Records. Geter flew Quinn out to Atlanta, Georgia on the day of the "I'm A King", music video shoot. Quinn took his keyboard with and went on to impress Geter with his skills. He gained major recognition in 2006, after producing "Shoulder Lean", from Grand Hustle artist Young Dro’s debut album Best Thang Smokin' (2006). It sold over 2 million ringtones, which led him to his first co-publishing deal with Warner Chappell Music and Grand Hustle at the age of 18.  In 2007, Quinn and T.I. formed a record production and songwriting team called The Smash Factory, alongside Lamar "Mars" Edwards of 1500 or Nothin'.

In late 2014, Quinn produced the remix of "Heaven Knows" for the fifth season winner of The Voice, Tessanne Chin. "Heaven Knows (Remix)" was released as a single by Republic Records in November 2014. In early 2015, Quinn signed with Kobalt Music Group on a new Administration deal. Also in 2015, Quinn produced "Offset" for T.I. and Young Thug, which is included on the soundtrack to the film Furious 7.

Production discography

Singles produced

Other songs

References

External links
 
 

 

African-American record producers
American hip hop record producers
Musicians from Jackson, Mississippi
Businesspeople from Jackson, Mississippi
Southern hip hop musicians
1987 births
Living people
Grand Hustle Records artists
21st-century African-American people
20th-century African-American people